Elections to Dungannon District Council were held on 19 May 1993 on the same day as the other Northern Irish local government elections. The election used four district electoral areas to elect a total of 22 councillors.

Election results

Note: "Votes" are the first preference votes.

Districts summary

|- class="unsortable" align="centre"
!rowspan=2 align="left"|Ward
! % 
!Cllrs
! % 
!Cllrs
! %
!Cllrs
! %
!Cllrs
! % 
!Cllrs
! % 
!Cllrs
!rowspan=2|TotalCllrs
|- class="unsortable" align="center"
!colspan=2 bgcolor="" | UUP
!colspan=2 bgcolor="" | Sinn Féin
!colspan=2 bgcolor="" | SDLP
!colspan=2 bgcolor="" | DUP
!colspan=2 bgcolor="" | DL
!colspan=2 bgcolor="white"| Others
|-
|align="left"|Blackwater
|bgcolor="40BFF5"|43.7
|bgcolor="40BFF5"|3
|9.5
|0
|18.2
|1
|28.6
|1
|0.0
|0
|0.0
|0
|5
|-
|align="left"|Clogher Valley
|bgcolor="40BFF5"|33.5
|bgcolor="40BFF5"|2
|19.5
|1
|28.9
|1
|18.1
|1
|0.0
|0
|0.0
|0
|5
|-
|align="left"|Dungannon Town
|bgcolor="40BFF5"|33.6
|bgcolor="40BFF5"|2
|20.4
|1
|12.3
|1
|15.6
|1
|7.9
|1
|10.2
|0
|6
|-
|align="left"|Torrent
|19.2
|1
|bgcolor="#008800"|43.0
|bgcolor="#008800"|3
|21.9
|1
|0.0
|0
|0.0
|0
|15.9
|1
|6
|- class="unsortable" class="sortbottom" style="background:#C9C9C9"
|align="left"| Total
|31.8
|8
|24.1
|5
|20.4
|4
|14.8
|3
|1.9
|1
|7.0
|1
|22
|-
|}

District results

Blackwater

1989: 3 x UUP, 1 x DUP, 1 x SDLP
1993: 3 x UUP, 1 x DUP, 1 x SDLP
1989-1993 Change: No change

Clogher Valley

1989: 2 x UUP, 1 x SDLP, 1 x Sinn Féin, 1 x DUP
1993: 2 x UUP, 1 x SDLP, 1 x Sinn Féin, 1 x DUP
1989-1993 Change: No change

Dungannon Town

1989: 2 x UUP, 1 x DUP, 1 x SDLP, 1 x Workers' Party, 1 x Independent Nationalist
1993: 2 x UUP, 1 x DUP, 1 x SDLP, 1 x Sinn Féin, 1 x Democratic Left
1989-1993 Change: Sinn Féin gain from Independent Nationalist, Workers' Party joins Democratic Left

Torrent

1989: 2 x Sinn Féin, 2 x SDLP, 1 x UUP, 1 x Independent Nationalist
1993: 3 x Sinn Féin, 1 x SDLP, 1 x UUP, 1 x Independent Nationalist
1989-1993 Change: Sinn Féin gain from SDLP

References

Dungannon and South Tyrone Borough Council elections
Dungannon and South Tyrone